Rolpa (earlier:Liwang municipality) is a municipality located in Rolpa District of Lumbini Province of Nepal. It is only municipality of Rolpa District. The municipality is surrounded by Sunchhahari and Swarnawati rural councils from the east, Tribeni & Madi rural councils from the West, Duikholi rural council from the North and Swarnawati & Runtigadhi from the South 

The municipality is divided into total 10 wards.

Background
The municipality was established on 2 December 2014, when the government announced 61 more new municipalities. This new municipality was established merging the two then VDCs, e.g. Liwang and Khumel and it was named Libang then, later on 10 March 2017 more VDCs Kotgaun, Jankot, Hwama  and Dhawang Incorporated with this municipality and renamed it to Rolpa.

Demographics
At the time of the 2011 Nepal census, Rolpa Municipality had a population of 34,347. Of these, 73.4% spoke Nepali, 18.4% Magar, 6.6% Kham, 1.0% Gurung, 0.2% Newar, 0.1% Bhojpuri, 0.1% Tharu language, 0.1% Maithili and 0.1% other languages as their first language.

In terms of ethnicity/caste, 43.7% were Magar, 27.4% Chhetri, 13.2% Kami, 4.9% Sanyasi/Dasnami, 4.4% Damai/Dholi, 2.6% Hill Brahmin, 1.5% Gurung, 0.9% Thakuri, 0.7% Newar and 0.7% others.

In terms of religion, 75.3% were Hindu, 22.8% Buddhist, 0.9% Prakriti, 0.7% Christian, 0.1% Muslim and 0.2% others.

See also
Rolpa District
Lumbini Province

References

Municipalities in Lumbini Province
Nepal municipalities established in 2014